Hamilton Park, also known as Brewster Park and Howard Avenue Grounds, was a sports venue in New Haven, Connecticut, located at the intersection of Whalley Avenue and West Park Avenue.

Hamilton Park hosted Yale University sports competitions in the 19th century. It was the first home field for Yale's football team, used from 1870 until Yale Field was acquired in the 1880s.

The park hosted horse races and was home to the New Haven Elm Citys baseball team of the National Association during the 1875 season. It is considered a major league ballpark by those who count the National Association as a major league as well as by those who recognize isolated games, as the Hartford club hosted one game there in 1877.

References

Yale Bulldogs football
American football venues in Connecticut
Defunct baseball venues in the United States
Defunct college football venues
Defunct horse racing venues in the United States
Defunct sports venues in Connecticut
Sports venues in New Haven, Connecticut